Nuttallia is a genus of saltwater clams, marine bivalve molluscs in the family Psammobiidae.

Species
Species within the genus Nutallia include:
Nuttallia ezonis Kuroda & Habe in Habe, 1955
Nuttallia japonica (Reeve, 1857)
Nuttallia nuttallii (Conrad, 1837)
Nuttallia obscurata (Reeve, 1857)
Nuttallia petri (Bartsch, 1929)

References 

Psammobiidae
Bivalve genera